The 1955 South Dakota State Jackrabbits football team was an American football team that represented South Dakota State University in the North Central Conference (NCC) during the 1955 college football season. In its ninth season under head coach Ralph Ginn, the team compiled a 6–2–1 record, won the NCC championship, and outscored opponents by a total of 197 to 114. 

The team's statistical leaders included Bob Betz with 725 rushing yards and Dick Steiner with 483 passing yards. Other key players included end Jerry Acheson, tackle Harwood Hoeft, guard Len Spanjers, center Dick Lawitter, and back Larry "Bubb" Korver.

Schedule

References

South Dakota State
South Dakota State Jackrabbits football seasons
North Central Conference football champion seasons
South Dakota State Jackrabbits football